Caligo teucer, the Teucer owl butterfly is a butterfly of the family Nymphalidae. It was described by Carl Linnaeus his 1758 10th edition of Systema Naturae. It is found from Colombia and Venezuela to Bolivia and Paraguay. The habitat consists of rainforests and cloudforests at altitudes ranging from 400 to 1,400 meters.

The wingspan is about 100 mm.

The larvae feed on Heliconia and Musa species.

Subspecies
Caligo teucer teucer
Caligo teucer ecuadora Joicey & Kaye, 1917 (Ecuador)
Caligo teucer insulanus Stichel, 1904 (Trinidad)
Caligo teucer japetus Stichel, 1903 (Paraguay)
Caligo teucer nubilus Fruhstorfer, 1907 (Guyana)
Caligo teucer obidonus Fruhstorfer, 1904 (Brazil: Pará, Amazonas)
Caligo teucer phorkys Fruhstorfer, 1912 (Bolivia)
Caligo teucer semicaerulea Joicey & Kaye, 1917 (Peru)

References

Butterflies described in 1758
Taxa named by Carl Linnaeus
Caligo
Fauna of Brazil
Nymphalidae of South America